T. koreensis may refer to:

Taibaiella koreensis, a Gram-negative bacterium.
Tanakia koreensis, a species of cyprinid.
Terrabacter koreensis, a Gram-positive bacterium.
Tetragenococcus koreensis, a Gram-positive bacterium.